Peter Eddie Myers (born September 15, 1963) is an American former professional basketball player and a former assistant coach for the NBA team Chicago Bulls. He is most famous for having been Michael Jordan’s replacement player during Jordan’s stint in baseball.

Early life and college career
Born in Mobile, Alabama, Myers graduated from Williamson High School of Mobile in 1981. Myers then attended Faulkner State Community College. At Faulkner State, Myers averaged nearly 14 points per game in his two-year career and was named to the 1983 All-Southern Division team. Myers transferred to the University of Arkansas at Little Rock in 1983 and played two seasons on the Arkansas–Little Rock Trojans men's basketball team after redshirting one year. At Arkansas–Little Rock, Myers was named to the All-Trans American Athletic Conference (TAAC) team both his junior and senior years and was part of the 1986 TAAC tournament championship team that advanced to the second round of the NCAA tournament.

Pro playing career

In the 1986 NBA draft, the Chicago Bulls selected Myers in the sixth round as the 120th overall pick. As a rookie, Myers played in 29 games with the Bulls and averaged 5.3 minutes and 2.3 points per game.

In 1987, Myers played for the Rockford Lightning of the CBA, was named a league All-Star, and won second place in the CBA slam dunk contest.

Myers then signed with the San Antonio Spurs in January 1988 and averaged 14.9 minutes, 5.1 points, 1.7 rebounds, and 2.2 assists in 22 games.

The Spurs traded Myers to the Philadelphia 76ers in August 1988. Controversially, Myers chose to play in the Spanish Liga ACB team Cai Zaragoza during the NBA preseason, and the 76ers sued to stop Myers. In 4 games with Zaragoza, Myers made 48.9% of field goals and averaged 12.3 points, 2.3 rebounds, and 2.8 assists.  Before being waived by the 76ers on December 15, Myers played 4 games with an average 10.0 minutes, 3.5 points, 2.5 rebounds, and 0.5 assists.

On December 20, 1988, Myers signed with the New York Knicks and played 29 games with an average 7.9 minutes, 2.8 points, 0.8 rebounds, and 1.6 assists. In the  season with the Knicks, Myers played 24 games with 8.7 minutes per game along with 1.9 points, 1.2 rebounds, and 1.5 assists.

Four days after the Knicks waived him, Myers signed with the New Jersey Nets on February 27, 1990, and played 28 games for the Nets. In those 28 games, Myers averaged 19.4 minutes, 7.1 points, 2.4 rebounds, and 3.6 assists and made 2 starts for the first starts in his NBA career.

On December 10, 1990, Myers signed as a free agent with the San Antonio Spurs and played 8 games with 1 start before being waived on December 24. Myers averaged 3.6 points, 2.3 rebounds, and 1.8 assists.

Myers then played for Fortitudo Pallacanestro Bologna (sponsorship name Aprimatic Bologna) of the Italian Lega Basket Serie A and signed with the CBA team Albany Patroons in April 1991. Myers returned to Fortitudo Bologna (new sponsorship name Mangiaebevi Bologna) after the CBA season ended.

After spending the  NBA preseason with the Washington Bullets, Myers played for Scavolini Pesaro of Serie A in the 1992–1993 season. Myers averaged 16.1 points, 6.4 rebounds, and 2.1 assists per game.

Myers played all 82 regular season games for the first time in his NBA career and started 81. Myers made career-high averages of 24.8 minutes, 7.9 points, 1.0 steal, and 3.0 assists per game as well as 2.2 rebounds. The following season, Myers played 71 games with 14 starts and averaged 4.5 points, 2.0 rebounds, and 2.1 assists. On March 15, 1995, Myers scored a season-high 14 points. However, Myers faced the possibility of being replaced as Michael Jordan was considering a comeback to the NBA. Jordan returned to the NBA for the first time, replacing Myers in the Bulls starting lineup the next game: March 17, 1995, against the Indiana Pacers.

Myers signed with the Charlotte Hornets on October 3, 1995, but was traded to the Miami Heat on November 3 before playing a game for the Hornets. With the Heat, Myers started 1 of 39 games played and averaged 4.7 points, 1.9 rebounds, and 2.5 assists.

After the Heat waived him, Myers returned to the Hornets on February 16, 1996. In 32 games and 1 start, Myers averaged 2.9 points, 2.1 rebounds, and 1.5 assists.

In 1997, Myers played for Polti Cantù and reached the Italian Cup finals.

Myers then signed with the NBA's New York Knicks on October 1, 1997. In 9 games, Myers averaged 1.6 points, 1.1 rebounds, and 0.3 assist. The Knicks waived Myers on January 6, 1998. Myers then re-joined the CBA team Rockford Lightning.

In January 1999, Myers signed with CBA team Quad City Thunder. In 21 games, Myers averaged 6.4 points per game.

Coaching career
Myers became a candidate for the Chicago Bulls assistant coaching staff on January 4, 2000, and joined Chicago's coaching staff on December 28, 2001. He became the interim head coach for two games when Bill Cartwright was fired in 2003. When the Bulls hired Scott Skiles, Myers went back to his regular duties at assistant coach. When Skiles was fired in 2007, Myers was named once again the interim head coach for one game before Jim Boylan became the head coach for the rest of the season. Myers' total head coaching record is 0–3.

Myers was dropped from the Bulls' coaching staff in the summer of 2010, after the arrival of new head coach Tom Thibodeau. For the 2010–11 season, Myers returned to the Bulls front office as a scout. In 2011, he became an assistant coach with the Golden State Warriors under Mark Jackson. In 2014, Myers and the rest of Jackson's staff were released by Golden State. On June 25, 2015, Myers returned to the Bulls as an assistant coach until May 23, 2019, when he departed for personal reasons.

Head coaching record

|-
| style="text-align:left;"|Chicago
| style="text-align:left;"|
|2||0||2|||| style="text-align:center;"|(interim)||—||—||—||—
| style="text-align:center;"|—
|-
| style="text-align:left;"|Chicago
| style="text-align:left;"|
|1||0||1|||| style="text-align:center;"|(interim)||—||—||—||—
| style="text-align:center;"|—
|- class="sortbottom"
| style="text-align:left;"|Career
| ||3||0||3|||| ||—||—||—||—

References

External links
 NBA profile

1963 births
Living people
20th-century African-American sportspeople
21st-century African-American sportspeople
African-American basketball players
American expatriate basketball people in Italy
American expatriate basketball people in Spain
American men's basketball coaches
American men's basketball players
Basketball coaches from Alabama
Basketball players from Alabama
CB Zaragoza players
Charlotte Hornets players
Chicago Bulls assistant coaches
Chicago Bulls draft picks
Chicago Bulls head coaches
Chicago Bulls players
Faulkner State Sun Chiefs men's basketball players
Fortitudo Pallacanestro Bologna players
Golden State Warriors assistant coaches
Little Rock Trojans men's basketball players
Miami Heat players
New Jersey Nets players
New York Knicks players
Pallacanestro Cantù players
People from Lombard, Illinois
Philadelphia 76ers players
San Antonio Spurs players
Shooting guards
Sportspeople from Mobile, Alabama
Victoria Libertas Pallacanestro players